Adrianov (masculine) or Adrianova (feminine) is a Russian last name. Variants of this last name include Andriankin/Andriankina (/), Andrianov/Andrianova (/), Andrin/Andrina (/), Andreyash, Andriyashev/Andriyasheva (/), and Andriyashin/Andriyashina (/).

All these last name derive from various forms of the male first name Adrian, which comes from Latin Adrianus, meaning an inhabitant of Adria (cf. Adriatic Sea). The forms starting with "An-" have likely formed by analogy with the names like Andrey and Andron.

People with the last name
Alexander Adrianov, Governor-General of Moscow, Russia in 1908–1915
Dmitry Adrianov, leader of the Balakovo branch of the Federation of Jewish Communities of the CIS
Irene Adrianova, 2004 darts World Master
Samuil Adrianov, ballet dancer; first husband of Elizaveta Gerdt
Vladimir Adrianov, designer of the Adrianov compass used by the Russian Imperial Army
Yevdokia Adrianova, a peasant Russian woman involved with the re-appearance of Our Lady Derzhavnaya, an 18th-century Russian icon

References

Notes

Sources
И. М. Ганжина (I. M. Ganzhina). "Словарь современных русских фамилий" (Dictionary of Modern Russian Last Names). Москва, 2001. 



Russian-language surnames
Patronymic surnames
Surnames from given names